Christian Geyer (born 12 April 1964) is a former professional tennis player from Germany.

Biography
Geyer was a left-handed player from Hamburg. He had early success as a doubles player at a WCT tournament in Dortmund in 1982 where he and Udo Riglewski had a win over Wimbledon winner Paul McNamee and his partner to make the quarter-finals. From 1984 he competed professionally and appeared in the singles main draws of six Grand Prix (later ATP Tour) tournaments, reaching the second round at both Hilversum and Vienna in 1989. At Challenger level he had his best year in 1990 when he won the title in Thessaloniki and also won a match over the world's 24th ranked player Christo van Rensburg at an event in Cape Town. In October 1990 he reached his highest ranking of 154.

Challenger titles

Singles: (1)

References

External links
 
 

1964 births
Living people
German male tennis players
West German male tennis players
Tennis players from Hamburg